Mimi J. Woods (born October 18, 1965) is a former Los Angeles-based voice actress known primarily for voice-overs in Japanese anime. She is best known for being the English voice of Motoko Kusanagi in the original Ghost in the Shell film and video game. She was also credited as Mimi J. Davies and M.J. Davis.

She has long since retired from acting. According to Mary Elizabeth McGlynn (the voice of Kusanagi in the Ghost in the Shell: Stand Alone Complex series), Woods had moved away from Los Angeles. The last voiceover role she was featured in was the English version of the video game The Bouncer, in which she voiced a television news anchor named after herself in the game's opening cinematic.

Dubbing roles

Animated film and series English dubbing
 Battle Athletes Victory – Lahrri Fernando
 Black Magic M-66 – Nakamura
 El Hazard series – Shayla-Shayla
 Ghost in the Shell – Motoko Kusanagi
 Macross II Lovers Again – Nastasha
 Moldiver – Agt. Jennifer
 Outlanders – Battia (L.A. Hero dub)
 Phantom Quest Corp. – Ruriko Asakaga
 The Super Dimension Fortress Macross II: Lovers, Again – Natasha
 The Super Dimension Century Orguss – Ripple, Athena

Video games English dubbing
 The Bouncer – Newscaster
 Ghost in the Shell – Motoko Kusanagi

References

External links

1965 births
American video game actresses
American voice actresses
Living people
20th-century American actresses
21st-century American actresses
Place of birth missing (living people)